Sodium/hydrogen exchanger 6 is an integral membrane protein that in humans is encoded by the SLC9A6 gene. It was originally thought to be a mitochondrial-targeted protein, but subsequent studies have localized it to the plasma membrane and recycling endosomes.

Loss of function causes Christianson syndrome.

See also

References

Further reading 

 
 
 
 
 

Solute carrier family